Allan Douglas Hunter  (23 September 1922 – 12 July 2017) was a New Zealand rugby union player and schoolteacher.

Early life and family
Born in Christchurch on 23 September 1922, Hunter was educated at Timaru Boys' High School from 1936 to 1940. He then studied at Canterbury University College, graduating Master of Arts with third-class honours in 1948.

Hunter's university studies were interrupted by World War II. He was called up in July 1941, but he was allowed to defer army training until after examinations at the end of that year. He served with the First Battalion, Canterbury Regiment, which was tasked with defending the Canterbury coast against attack by the Japanese. He later travelled to Britain where he joined the Royal Navy and was commissioned as a sub-lieutenant, and served in HMS Rutherford from 1944 to 1945.

Hunter married Joan Esme Tyler, and the couple went on to have three children.

Rugby union
While at Timaru Boys' High School, Hunter played for the school's 1st XV rugby team. He then played for the Canterbury University College club team alongside Bob Stuart, Larry Savage, and Jack Kelly. After moving to Napier in 1949, Hunter was selected for the Hawke's Bay provincial team, playing as a first five-eighth.

Teaching career
Hunter taught at Napier Boys' High School from 1949, and Kuranui College, before being appointed principal of Upper Hutt College in 1962. He remained in that position until 1969, when he moved to Burnside High School in Christchurch, serving as principal until his retirement in 1980.

Later life and death
In retirement, Hunter was active in community organisations, and was the inaugural president of the Burnside Men's Probus club.
In 1995, he wrote a history of the Bishopdale–Burnside Rotary club, having been an inaugural member of the club in 1974 and its president from 1981 to 1982. He also wrote an account of the First Battalion Canterbury Regiment's coastal defence duties during World War II, published in 2000 and titled The Young Defenders. In the 2005 Queen's Birthday Honours, Hunter was appointed a Member of the New Zealand Order of Merit, for services to education and the community.

Hunter's wife, Joan, died in 2002. Hunter himself died in Christchurch on 12 July 2017.

References

1922 births
2017 deaths
People from Christchurch
People educated at Timaru Boys' High School
New Zealand military personnel of World War II
Royal Navy officers of World War II
University of Canterbury alumni
New Zealand rugby union players
Hawke's Bay rugby union players
Heads of schools in New Zealand
20th-century New Zealand historians
Members of the New Zealand Order of Merit
Rugby union players from Christchurch